Middleburg is an unincorporated community in Iowa, United States. Located in Sioux County, it is near Sioux Center, Boyden and Orange City.

History
Middleburg's population was 47 in 1925.

References

Unincorporated communities in Sioux County, Iowa
Unincorporated communities in Iowa